Kim Hagger (born 2 December 1961) is a female retired English athlete who competed mainly in the heptathlon and the long jump. She represented Great Britain at the 1984 Los Angeles Olympics and the 1988 Seoul Olympics.

Career
Hagger was born in Plaistow, Essex. She won the AAA Championships Under 15 long jump title in 1975 and 1976, and the Under 17 title in 1977 and 1978.

She competed at her first Olympic Games in Los Angeles 1984, finishing eighth in the heptathlon with 6127 points. In 1986, she reached her peak at both heptathlon and long jump. In May, she achieved a score of 6259 in Arles. As of 2014, this still ranks her sixth on the UK all-time heptathlon list. Later in 1986, she won the UK long jump title, before going on to win a bronze medal in the heptathlon for England at the Commonwealth Games in Edinburgh, with a score of 5823. She also finished fourth in the long jump. Two weeks later at the European Championships in Stuttgart, she finished ninth in the heptathlon with 6173. That score included a lifetime best long jump performance of 6.70 m.

In 1987, Hagger finished ninth in the heptathlon at the World Championships in Rome, with a score of 6167. At her second Olympics in Seoul 1988, she finished 17th with 5975. She also  finished 17th overall in the long jump qualifying round.  In 1989, she won the AAAs national heptathlon title. She represented England, at the 1990 Commonwealth Games in Auckland, New Zealand. She won her final national title in 1991, when she won the AAAs Indoor long jump championship for the third time.

She was known for her complex theory on how to hold the javelin.

National titles
1986 UK Long Jump champion
1989 AAAs Heptathlon champion 
1988/90/91 AAAs Indoor Long Jump champion

International competitions

Note: Results with a Q, indicate overall position in qualifying round.

References

External links

1961 births
Living people
Athletes from London
People from Plaistow, Newham
British heptathletes
English heptathletes
British female long jumpers
English female long jumpers
Athletes (track and field) at the 1984 Summer Olympics
Athletes (track and field) at the 1988 Summer Olympics
Olympic athletes of Great Britain
Commonwealth Games medallists in athletics
Athletes (track and field) at the 1986 Commonwealth Games
Athletes (track and field) at the 1990 Commonwealth Games
World Athletics Championships athletes for Great Britain
Commonwealth Games bronze medallists for England
Medallists at the 1986 Commonwealth Games